is a former Japanese football player. He played for Japan national team.

Club career
Iwamoto was born in Yokohama on May 2, 1972. After graduating from high school, he joined Fujita Industries (later Bellmare Hiratsuka) in 1991. In 1994, the club won 1994 Emperor's Cup. In Asia, the club also won 1995 Asian Cup Winners' Cup. After that, he could not become regular player due to injuries. In the latter the 1990s, he played for Kyoto Purple Sanga (1998), Kawasaki Frontale (1999) and Verdy Kawasaki (2000). In 2001, he moved to Vegalta Sendai. At the club, he became a regular player and assisted many goals. In 2004, he moved to Nagoya Grampus Eight. However he got hurt in May and he left the club end of the season. In October 2006, he signed with Auckland City and played until December. In December, he also played at 2006 Club World Cup in Japan. He retired after 2006 Club World Cup.

National team career
On May 22, 1994, Iwamoto debuted for Japan national team against Australia. He also played at 1994 Asian Games. At Asian Games, he wore the number 10 shirt for Japan. He played 9 games and scored 2 goals for Japan in 1994.

Club statistics

National team statistics

References

External links

 
 Japan National Football Team Database
 

1972 births
Living people
Association football people from Kanagawa Prefecture
Japanese footballers
Japan international footballers
Japan Soccer League players
J1 League players
J2 League players
Japan Football League (1992–1998) players
Shonan Bellmare players
Kyoto Sanga FC players
Kawasaki Frontale players
Tokyo Verdy players
Vegalta Sendai players
Nagoya Grampus players
Auckland City FC players
Japanese expatriate footballers
Expatriate association footballers in New Zealand
Association football midfielders
New Zealand Football Championship players
Footballers at the 1994 Asian Games
Asian Games competitors for Japan